Guy Richard Bingham (born February 25, 1958) is a former American football center in the National Football League for the New York Jets, Atlanta Falcons, and the Washington Redskins.  He played college football at the University of Montana and was drafted in the tenth round of the 1980 NFL Draft.

Bingham attended and played high school football at J. M. Weatherwax High School in Aberdeen, Washington.  On September 25, 2009, he donated back a football to J. M. Weatherwax High School during half time at the high school's football game.  The football was signed by him and his teammates when he played with the New York Jets.  He signed this football during a game against the Seattle Seahawks.  Bingham and former NFL Pittsburgh Steelers player Mark Bruener who also graduated from J. M. Weatherwax High School were made honorary captains at this game.

References

1958 births
Living people
American football offensive linemen
American football long snappers
New York Jets players
Atlanta Falcons players
Washington Redskins players
Montana Grizzlies football players